Christian III, Count Palatine of Zweibrücken-Birkenfeld (Strassburg, 7 November 1674 – Zweibrücken, 3 February 1735) was a German nobleman. He was a member of the House of Palatinate-Zweibrücken-Birkenfeld, a cadet branch of the House of Wittelsbach. He was the son of Christian II of Zweibrücken-Birkenfeld and Katharina Agathe, Countess of Rappoltstein. He was Count Palatine of Zweibrücken-Birkenfeld from 1717 to 1731.  In 1731, he inherited the sovereign duchy of Palatine Zweibrücken and thus became Count Palatine and Duke of Zweibrücken.  He was also Count of Rappoltstein from 1699 until his death.

Life 
Christian was born in Strasbourg in 1674.  He was the only son of Christian II, Count Palatine of Zweibrücken-Birkenfeld to survive into adulthood.

He began his career in the French military in 1697 and took over the Alsatian regiment.  In 1699, he inherited the County of Rappoltstein from his mother.  In 1702 he became Field marshal and in 1704 he was promoted to lieutenant general.  He excelled militarily at the Battle of Oudenaarde in 1708.

In 1717, his father died.  He left the army and took up administration of Zweibrücken-Birkenfeld, which was a small part of the County of Sponheim. In 1731, Count Palatine Gustavus Samuel Leopold of Zweibrücken died childless and Christian III inherited his territory.  His relatives objected, but in a treaty with Elector Palatine Charles III Philip concluded in Mannheim on 24 December 1733, it was agreed that Christian would receive Palatine Zweibrücken.

He died in Zweibrücken in 1735 and is buried alongside other counts/dukes of the house's line, in the crypt of Alexander's Church in Zweibrücken, built in 1493 by his ancestor Alexander, Count Palatine of Zweibrücken.

Marriage and issue 
In 1719, at the castle in Lorentzen, he married Caroline of Nassau-Saarbrücken (1704–1774) and had four children.

Ancestry

References 

 Maximilian V. Sattler: Lehrbuch der bayerischen Geschichte, Lindauer, 1868, p. 411
 Johann Georg Lehmann: Vollständige Geschichte des Herzogtums Zweibrücken und seiner Fürsten, Kaiser, 1867, p. 485 ff.

External links

freepages.genealogy.rootsweb.ancestry.com/

1674 births
1735 deaths
Counts Palatine of Zweibrücken
House of Palatinate-Zweibrücken
House of Wittelsbach
People from Strasbourg
Burials at the Alexanderkirche, Zweibrücken